The badge on the Flag of South Australia depicts the rising sun, and a Piping Shrike standing on a branch of a gum tree. The Piping Shrike is more commonly known as a White-backed Magpie. 

The Piping Shrike is sometimes mistakenly associated with the Magpie-lark, aka the Murray Magpie, Pee Wee and Mudlark. This confusion came about because some did not realise that the image always shows the back of the bird. Once it is realised that it is the back of the bird, it can be seen that it is unmistakably a White-backed Magpie. 
The South Australian Governor used the term Piping Shrike for the White-backed Magpie in correspondence, and wrote the words "Australian piping shrike" on the back of drawing proposals of the bird for the State badge of South Australia in the early 1900s. 

The name Piping Shrike is closely linked to the early name for the Australian Magpie. From the early 1800s, the name Piping Crow Shrike was used for the Black-backed Magpie, which is the nominate race of the Australian Magpie in today’s taxonomies. The name that was used for the White-backed Magpie, the Piping Shrike on the State Badge, was the White Backed Crow Shrike. Both are in the same species (Australian Magpie) in today’s taxonomies. A review of newspaper articles from the early 1900s, and the South Australian Bird Protection Act of 1900, show that people were grouping both Black-backed Magpies and White-backed Magpies under the general name “Piping Crow Shrikes”.
The Latin name for the White-backed Magpie is Gymnorhina tibicen telonocua. Tibicen relates to piping or piper, hence the name Piping Shrike.

Origins
The piping shrike first appeared on the Governor's ensign in 1903, and was also on the State Badge which was proclaimed in 1904. The original reports credited it to H. P. Gill who was the director of the School of Arts, with some input and critique from the Governor General Hallam Tennyson, 2nd Baron Tennyson. The nephew of Robert Craig of the School of Arts claims that he was solely responsible for the original design. A similar argument is made by the relatives of the Adelaide artist Frances Jane Warhurst who claim that she based it on the eagle on the seal of the Prussian consul, a close friend of hers.  There are also reports of a later version also credited to Gill in 1910. The badge design, which set the bird against a backdrop of the yellow risen sun of Australian Federation, was incorporated into the state flag (1904) and the Coat of Arms (1984).

The name Piping Shrike was already in colloquial use for the Australian Magpie before the Governor used it as the official name for the bird on the original painting. An example of the usage of the term Piping Shrike for the Australian Magpie can be seen in a newspaper from 1891.

Acceptance of The State Badge of South Australia
On Wednesday 27 February 1901 the painting by H.P Gill (Link to Original Watercolour) was approved by both the Governor and the Premier of South Australia as the design of the new State Badge for South Australia.
The Premier wrote on the back of the painting “Accepted (without pomegranate)”. The Governor wrote the following heraldic description on the back of the painting: “The rising sun – or – Thereon an Australian piping shrike displayed proper – under a pomegranate flower amid leaves and standing on a gum-staff, raguly, gules and vert.” (or = gold, displayed proper = in its natural colours, raguly = with oblique lines, gules = red, vert = green). The Governor removed the reference to the pomegranate, and crossed out gum and changed gum-staff to staff of gum tree. 

The viewer sees the back of the bird: this can be confirmed by the position of the bird’s tail over the back of the gum-tree branch. The bird’s head is turned to its left.

Identification of the bird
The original reports state that the Piping Shrike is the Australian Magpie,  and government sources specify the subspecies as the White-backed Magpie (Gymnorhina tibicen leuconota). The range of the subspecies (Gymnorhina tibicen telonocua) of the Australian Magpie is almost entirely confined to South Australia. The common name for Gymnorhina tibicen leuconota is the White-backed Magpie. The name Piping Shrike is rarely found in current bird books, but it remains as an occasionally used local name for the bird because of the continuous history of the name as the bird on the state flag of South Australia.

The following words, endorsed by Professor Gisela Kaplan, an eminent Australian authority on the Australian Magpie, explain why there has been some confusion over the identity. ‘--- Confusion has arisen about the state emblem because it is easy to think one is viewing the front of the bird. Once one realises that one is viewing the back of the bird, one can see all the distinguishing features of the White-backed Magpie. The bird on the SA State Flag is without doubt a White-backed Magpie.”

The name for the bird which appears in Governor Tennyson’s handwriting on the back original painting is “Australian piping shrike”. As Professor Kaplan has confirmed, the bird is clearly a White-backed Magpie, so this leaves no doubt about the identity of the piping shrike.

The connection of this bird to the name Piping Shrike can be seen in this early observation by explorer Charles Sturt in the 1840s:

"GYMNORHINA LEUCONOTA GOULD., The White-backed Crow Shrike. This bird is somewhat larger than, and very much resembles a magpie, but the proportion of white is greater, and there is no metallic or varied tint on the black feathers as on the European bird. In South Australia it is a winter bird, and his clear fine note was always the most heard on the coldest morning, as if that temperature best suited him. All the species of this genus are easily domesticated, and learn to pipe tunes. They are mischievous birds about a house, but are useful in a garden. I had one that ranged the fields to a great distance round the house, but always returned to sleep in it." Note: This observation is comparing the White Backed Crow Shrike (earlier name for the White Backed Magpie) to the Eurasian Magpie known to the early English colonists.

Over time, Australian Magpies have been associated with the terms “Crow”, “Shrike”, and “Magpie”. These names were given to them by early arrivals as there was a perceived similarity to the birds, having these names, in Europe. It is now known that the Australian Magpie is neither a Magpie, Crow, nor Shrike in the European sense of the words. The Australian Magpie is most closely related to the Australian butcherbirds.

Usage of the common names Piping Crow-Shrike and White Backed Crow-Shrike eventually lost favour and were replaced by Black-backed Magpie and White-backed Magpie. 
This may have been influenced by the work of Robert Hall, who was a Fellow of the Linnean Society, which was founded in 1788 and is “dedicated to the study of natural history and taxonomy.” The society is the oldest of its type, and seems to have played quite a role in the early natural history of Australia.

In his book, “Useful Birds of Southern Australia” published in 1907, Robert Hall argued that the name Magpie was a misnomer and that the names Piping Crow-Shrike and White Backed Crow-Shrike were the correct names. However, he stated that he would defer to popular opinion and he retained the names White-backed Magpie and the Black-backed Magpie in the book. He also noted that the two birds appeared to be varieties of the same species.

In today's taxonomies, the very apt name tibicen, which is related to piping, is retained in the scientific name Gymnorhina tibicen for all races of the species.

In Higgins et al. “Handbook of Australian, New Zealand and Antarctic birds”, Piping Shrike is listed as one of the other English names for the Australian Magpie.

In Australian Bird Names Origins and Meanings, Fraser and Gray include “Piping Shrike, as formally described on the South Australian flag and coat of arms” in the section on other names for Gymnorhina tibicen telonocua (the White-backed Magpie).

In Birds of South Australia, Shane Parker, Curator of Birds, South Australian Museum, states: The White-backed Magpie is the “piping shrike” of South Australia’s badge.

The Wakefield Companion to South Australian History states: “---- a White-backed Magpie (piping shrike) on the branch of a gum tree against a yellow background, representing the rising sun.”

Sources of Confusion

ABC 891 Adelaide Afternoons Podcast 

This section refers to an ABC podcast “Does our state emblem, the piping shrike, actually exist.” In the ABC podcast, two experts were interviewed. The first was Professor Gisela Kaplan, a recognised authority on the Australian Magpie. The professor struggled to recognise the bird because she did not realise that the image showed the back of the bird. 

The professor also noted that she had not seen the name Piping Shrike in bird books. However, the reader should note that a number of bird books are referenced in this article where the name Piping Shrike is recognised as a local name for the White-backed Magpie and as the name for the bird on the state flag of South Australia.

A heraldry expert was also interviewed. He noted that in heraldry, stylising of the image is allowed. He did not state that the image on the state flag was stylised. He pointed out that the bird on our flag was a Piping Shrike, or White-backed Magpie.

The podcast summary drew several incorrect conclusions: One was that the Piping Shrike image was stylised, implying that the bird could not be identified by viewing the image. The second was that the Piping Shrike was not a real bird and does not exist. 
These errors are based on the original mistake of not realising the image shows the back of the bird.

In 2020, Professor Kaplan provided the following comment:
“The statements by Professor Kaplan about the piping shrike’s existence were given in a strict context in that they were merely meant to convey that the name “Piping Shrike” does not appear in today’s bird books. Her comments should not be interpreted as evidence that a bird once named a ‘Piping Shrike does not exist or does not represent a real bird. 
Confusion has arisen about the state emblem because it is easy to think one is viewing the front of the bird. 
Once one realises that one is viewing the back of the bird, one can see all the distinguishing features of the White Backed Magpie. The bird on the SA State Flag is without doubt a White Backed magpie.”

The summary of the ABC podcast has not been corrected or removed from the ABC website.

BankSA Piping Shrike Advertisements 

BankSA run a series of Piping Shrike advertisements but it is clear that the Piping Shrike in the BankSA advertisements is based on the wrong bird. It has features of the Magpie Lark, whereas, it should be based on the White-backed Magpie. The image in the advertisements is often shown facing the viewer, with wings raised, and its head turned to its right. This suggests that the designer of the advertisements made the common mistake of thinking the image on the flag shows the front of the bird: The image on our flag shows the back of the bird and the bird always has its head turned to its left.

References

External links
State badge of South Australia
State Records of South Australia - Original Painting of the Piping Shrike
Birdlife Australia: The Bird of Our State - South Australia
Environment SA White-backed Magpie - Piping Shrike Page 57
Government of South Australia: Use of the Piping Shrike (pdf)
Narrative of an expedition into Central Australia by Charles Sturt: Birds
http://birdlife.org.au/bird-profile/Australian-magpie Bird Life Australian Magpie
http://www.abc.net.au/reslib/200908/r427423_2038331.pdf ABC Operation Magpie Fact Sheet 4
https://birdssa.asn.au/birddirectory/australian-magpie/ Birds SA bird directory

Emblems of South Australia
Passeriformes
.
Bird common names
Heraldic birds